John Neely Bryan (December 24, 1810 – September 8, 1877) was a Presbyterian farmer, lawyer, and tradesman in the United States and founder of the city of Dallas, Texas.

Early life 
Bryan was born to James and Elizabeth (Neely) Bryan in Fayetteville, Tennessee.  There, he attended the Fayetteville Military Academy and after studying law was admitted to the Tennessee Bar.  Around the year 1833 he left Tennessee and moved to Arkansas, where he was an Indian trader.  According to some sources, he and a business partner laid out Van Buren, Arkansas.

Exploring Dallas 
Bryan visited the Dallas area in 1839, and in 1841, he established a permanent settlement, which eventually became the burgeoning city of Dallas.

Establishment of Dallas 
Bryan was very important to early Dallas — he served as the postmaster, a store owner, a ferry operator (he operated a ferry where Commerce Street crosses the Trinity River today), and his home served as the courthouse.  In 1844, he persuaded J. P. Dumas to survey and plot the site of Dallas and possibly help him with the work. Bryan was instrumental in the organizing of Dallas County in 1846 and in the election by voters of Dallas as its county seat in August 1850 (over the towns of Cedar Springs and Oak Cliff). When Dallas became the county seat, Bryan donated the land for the courthouse.  In 1843, he married Margaret Beeman, a daughter of the Beeman family who settled in Dallas from Bird's Fort.  The couple had five children. Another Beeman, John, arrived in Dallas in April 1842 and planted the first corn.

Gold rush 
In 1849, Bryan went to California during the gold rush but returned within a year.  In January 1853 he was a delegate to the Texas state Democratic convention.  In 1855, Bryan shot a man who had insulted his wife and fled to the Creek Nation.  The man he shot made a full recovery, and Bryan certainly would've been informed, but still Bryan did not return to Dallas for about six years.  During that time he travelled to Colorado and California, probably looking for gold.  He returned to Dallas in time to take part in a brief military expedition against the Comanche Indians in 1860.

Late life 
Bryan joined Col. Nicholas H. Darnell's Eighteenth Texas Cavalry regiment in the winter of 1861 and served with the unit until late 1862 when he was discharged due to his old age and poor health.  He returned to Dallas in 1862 and again became actively involved in community affairs.  In 1863, he was a trustee for the Dallas Male and Female Academy.  In 1866, during a Dallas flood, he was very prominent in aiding those affected.  He also chaired a citizens' meeting that pushed the Houston and Texas Central Railway to complete the railway through the city, and presided at a rally that sought to get full political rights for all ex-Confederates.  In 1871 and 1872 Bryan became one of the directors of the Dallas Bridge Company, which built the first iron bridge across the Trinity River.  He also stood on the platform at the welcoming ceremonies for the Houston and Texas Central Railway when the first train pulled into town in mid-July 1872.

By 1874 Bryan's mind was clearly impaired; though, it is not known exactly how.  "I am the son of John Neely Bryan, now before the court," Edward T. Bryan testified on Feb. 1, 1877. "My father is insane." He was admitted to the Texas State Lunatic Asylum in February 1877 and died there on 8 September 1877.  He is believed to be buried in an unmarked grave in the southeast quadrant of the Austin State Hospital Cemetery. In 2006, Bryan's descendants placed a headstone in the cemetery that reads "PVT 18 Texas CAV CSA Dec 24 1810 Sep 8 1877 Founder of Dallas Texas."

In 1954, a white granite marker honoring the Dallas founder was erected by the James Butler Bonham chapter of the Daughters of the Republic of Texas in Pioneer Cemetery (Pioneer Plaza).

A large marker bearing the name "Bryan" and displaying two "Citizen of the Republic of Texas" medallions honoring John Neely Bryan and his wife stands in Riverside Cemetery at Wichita Falls, Texas. It overlooks the graves of Margaret Beeman Bryan (1825-1919), her son John Neely Bryan, Jr. (1846-1926), and other family members.

A Texas Historical Marker "Beeman Memorial Cemetery," located east of downtown Dallas just off of Dolphin Road, states that John Neely Bryan is buried in the Beeman family plot of his wife, Margaret, and other Beeman family members.  This cemetery is somewhat hard to locate, but is located just behind a large Jewish Cemetery (Shearith Israel) on Dolphin Road just south of Military Parkway.

The Bryan Pergola, standing on the Grassy Knoll in Dealey Plaza, Dallas, Texas, is named after John Neely Bryan (1810-1877), the recognized founder of the City of Dallas.

Dallas Independent School District named an elementary school after him, John Neely Bryan Elementary.

Cultural references 
The concrete pergola upon which Abraham Zapruder was standing during the John F. Kennedy assassination as he made the Zapruder film was originally placed in Dealey Plaza in honor of Bryan, and is named for him.

References 

 
 

People from Fayetteville, Tennessee
Lawyers from Dallas
People of the California Gold Rush
People of Texas in the American Civil War
History of Dallas
American city founders
1810 births
1877 deaths
Tennessee lawyers
Texas postmasters
Texas Democrats